Dierkow near Rostock, Mecklenburg, was a Viking Age Slavic-Scandinavian settlement at the southern Baltic coast in the late 8th and early 9th century. Neither the site itself, nor the adjacent Slavic burghs Kessin and Fresendorf have yet been sufficiently researched.

References

See also
Pomerania during the Early Middle Ages
Viking Age

Mecklenburg-Vorpommern
Viking Age populated places
Former populated places in Germany